Alvania jeffreysi is a species of minute sea snail, a marine gastropod mollusk or micromollusk in the family Rissoidae.

Distribution

Description 
It was named in honour of conchologist and malacologist John Gwyn Jeffreys.

The maximum recorded shell length is 2.3 mm.

Habitat 
Minimum recorded depth is 264 m. Maximum recorded depth is 264 m.

References

 

Rissoidae
Gastropods described in 1864